Gene Gibson coached the Texas Tech Red Raiders basketball teams from 1961 to 1969 and the third-most conference victories in Tech's history. In Gibson's eight seasons at Texas Tech, he compiled a 101–91 record won two conference co-championships and earned one NCAA tournament bid.

1961–62

1962–63

Source:

1963–64

Source:

1964–65

1965–66

Source:

1966–67

Source:

1967–68

Source:

1968–69

Source:

References

Texas Tech Red Raiders basketball seasons